Saphan Sung is one of the 50 districts (khet) of Bangkok, Thailand. Located on the eastern part of the capital, it is bounded by other Bangkok districts (from north clockwise): Khan Na Yao, Min Buri, Lat Krabang, Prawet, Suan Luang, Bang Kapi, and Bueng Kum. Most part of Saphan Sung district are low density residential area.

History
Saphan Sung was separated from Bueng Kum on 14 October 1997 announcement, effective 21 November 1997, together with Khan Na Yao. Saphan Sung means tall bridge referring to the shape of bridge built over khlongs (Thai canals) back when boats were a main mode of transportation.

Administration
The district has three sub-districts (khwaeng).

Places
 Wat Lat Bua Khao (วัดลาดบัวขาว)
 Triam Udom Suksa Nomklao School
 Saphan Sung Discovery Learning Library
 Saphan Sung Youth Centre
 Pra-Ajahn Mitsuo Gavesako Foundation

District Council

The District Council for Saphan Sung has seven members, who each serve four-year terms. Elections were last held on April 30, 2006. The results were as follows:
 Democrat Party - 7 seats

References

External links
 Planning Department maps of Saphan Sung District

Districts of Bangkok